Tarun Kanti Ghosh is an Indian politician. He was elected to the Lok Sabha, the lower house of the Parliament of India from the Barasat constituency of West Bengal in 1984 as a member of the Indian National Congress.

References

Indian National Congress politicians
Lok Sabha members from West Bengal
India MPs 1984–1989
Possibly living people
Year of birth missing
People from North 24 Parganas district